Michael Kale Huff (born August 11, 1963) is an American former professional Major League Baseball (MLB) outfielder who played for several teams between 1989 and 1996.

Amateur career
A native of Honolulu, Hawaii, Huff played college baseball at Northwestern University. In 1984, he played collegiate summer baseball with the Falmouth Commodores of the Cape Cod Baseball League.

Professional career
He was drafted in the sixteenth round (402nd overall) in the 1985 Major League Baseball Draft. Over his career in the majors, Huff played outfield with the Dodgers, Indians, White Sox, and Blue Jays from 1989 to 1996. Huff was a member of the 1993 Western Division Champion White Sox.

Broadcasting career
He occasionally served as a television broadcast announcer for the Chicago White Sox, filling in for regular announcers Ken Harrelson and Steve Stone.  Huff also has been known to make appearances at Coal City High School, at the request of Dean Vigna. He speaks to the Varsity Club about his experiences and life in the MLB.

References

External links

1963 births
Living people
Albuquerque Dukes players
American expatriate baseball players in Canada
Baseball players from Honolulu
Chicago White Sox players
Cleveland Indians players
Falmouth Commodores players
Great Falls Dodgers players
Los Angeles Dodgers players
Major League Baseball outfielders
Nashville Sounds players
Northwestern Wildcats baseball players
San Antonio Dodgers players
San Antonio Missions players
South Bend White Sox players
Syracuse Chiefs players
Toronto Blue Jays players
Vancouver Canadians players
Vero Beach Dodgers players
New Trier High School alumni